Navajas is a municipality in the comarca of Alto Palancia, Castellón, Valencia, Spain. It is located in the mountains, and a river runs through toward Salto de la Novia.
The most famous tourist attraction of Navajas is the surrounding countryside area, in particular a spectacular 60-meter waterfall, which waters flow into the river called Salto de la Novia or the Bride's Jump.

References

External links

A trip to Navajas

The Bride's Jump, Navajas

Municipalities in the Province of Castellón
Alto Palancia